Service Data Adaptation Protocol is a protocol specified by 3GPP. The SDAP sublayer is configured by RRC. SDAP maps the QoS flow to the Bearer service.

References

3GPP standards